Soo Township is a civil township of Chippewa County in the U.S. state of Michigan. The population was 3,141 at the 2010 census.

Communities
 Neebish Island is separated from the township by waters of St. Marys River. Its hundred-odd permanent residents comprise an unincorporated community.

Geography
Soo Township consists of two section in northeastern Chippewa County, connected by a stretch of the St. Marys River. The northwestern section is part of the Upper Peninsula of Michigan and is bordered to the north by the city of Sault Ste. Marie. It extends west into Izaak Walton Bay on the St. Marys River (upstream from Sault Ste. Marie) and east as far as the Little Rapids Channel of the river (downstream from Sault Ste. Marie). The southeastern portion of the township, about 43% of the township's total territory, comprises Neebish Island,  downriver from the rest of the township.

Demographics
As of the 2000 United States Census, there were 2,652 people, 1,075 households, and 795 families in the township. The racial makeup of the township was 83.56% White, 0.11% African American, 11.20% Native American, 0.38% Asian, and 4.75% from two or more races. Hispanic or Latino of any race were 0.38% of the population.

There were 1,075 households, out of which 28.8% had children under the age of 18 living with them, 63.8% were married couples living together, 7.0% had a female householder with no husband present, and 26.0% were non-families. 21.5% of all households were made up of individuals, and 7.0% had someone living alone who was 65 years of age or older. The average household size was 2.47 and the average family size was 2.87.

The township population contained 23.0% under the age of 18, 7.5% from 18 to 24, 26.9% from 25 to 44, 28.4% from 45 to 64, and 14.1% who were 65 years of age or older. The median age was 41 years. For every 100 females, there were 103.7 males. For every 100 females age 18 and over, there were 104.0 males.

The median income for a household in the township was $42,917, and the median income for a family was $49,137. Males had a median income of $38,750 versus $27,196 for females. The per capita income for the township was $20,625.  About 2.7% of families and 4.4% of the population were below the poverty line, including 4.5% of those under age 18 and 4.8% of those age 65 or over.

References

External links
Soo Township official website

Townships in Chippewa County, Michigan
Townships in Michigan